Hillclimbing, also known as hill climbing, speed hillclimbing, or speed hill climbing, is a branch of motorsport in which drivers compete against the clock to complete an uphill course. It is one of the oldest forms of motorsport, since the first known hillclimb at La Turbie near Nice, France, took place as long ago as 31 January 1897. The hillclimb held at Shelsley Walsh, in Worcestershire, England is the world's oldest continuously staged motorsport event still staged on its original course, having been first run in 1905.

Europe
Hillclimbs in continental Europe are usually held on courses which are several kilometres long, taking advantage of the available hills and mountains including the Alps. The most prestigious competition is the FIA European Hill Climb Championship.

Austria

An Austrian venue: Gaisberg. An historic course is at Semmering.

Great Britain

In Great Britain, the format is different from that in other parts of Europe, with courses being much shorter. Cairncastle is Great Britain's longest hillclimb at 1.65 miles (2904 yards). These short courses are more akin to uphill sprints – and almost always take under one minute for the fastest drivers to complete. For this reason, cars and drivers do not generally cross between the British and continental European championships.

Hillclimbing is also relevant to motorcycle sport; the governing body is the National Hill Climb Association.

France
The French hill climb championship, or Championnat de France de la Montagne, has been one of the most competitive of the European national series, attracting many new F2 and 2-litre sports cars during the 1970s and early 1980s. Notable champions from this period include Pierre Maublanc (1967 and 1968), Daniel Rouveyran (1969), Hervé Bayard (1970) and Jimmy Mieusset (1971, 1972, 1973 and 1974). The best-known Course de Côte are Mont Ventoux and Mont-Dore.

Germany
Three German venues: Freiburg-Schauinsland, Rossfeld (near Berchtesgaden), Osnabrück.
The fourth International Schauinsland hillclimb at Freiburg was held on August 5, 1928: "A car made the fastest time of the day, Heusser's Bugatti putting up 74.009 km/h, the fastest motorcycle being Stegmann's DKW at 69.6 km/h." Caracciola (Mercedes) won the over two-litre racing car class.

Italy
In the Italian championship, also known as the Campionato Italiano Velocità Montagna, there are the longest and most challenging hillclimbs like Trento-Bondone, Coppa Bruno Carotti (the Italian races in FIA European Hill Climb Championship), Pedavena-Croce d'Aune, Monte Erice and Verzegnis-Sella Chianzutan, which are also the most known.
Hillclimbing in Italy became famous in the 1970s, early 1980s, between 1994 and 2000 and at the end of the 2000s, especially in the last two periods thanks to TV services, magazines and live Internet commentaries.
The most famous Italian drivers, who won a lot even in Europe, are Ludovico Scarfiotti (famous Ferrari driver who won the F1 race in Monza 1966), "Noris" (he won almost every race in Italy until 1972, when he died), Domenico Scola (who runs a Sport Prototype even now at the age of 80), Mauro Nesti (over 20 championships between Italy and Europe, from the 1970s to the 1990s), Ezio Baribbi (three times Italian champion), Fabio Danti (1994 Italian champion, 1995-96 European champion, died in 2000), Pasquale Irlando (Italian champion in the early 1990s and European champion in the last 1990s, the one who turned the Osella PA20), Franz Tschager (three times European champion in the early 2000s), Simone Faggioli (the real Italian champion of the 2000s) and Denny Zardo (Italian champion in 2005 and 2008, European champion in 2003)

Malta
Hillclimbing is a very popular sport on the island of Malta. Numerous events are organised annually by the Island Car Club. Participants are divided according to their type of vehicle into various categories ranging from single seaters to saloon cars.

Romania

In Romania, the first major event was the Feleac course, in Cluj. From 1930, it was a round in the European Hill Climb Championship. A record of the Feleac was set by famous German racer Hans Stuck in 1938, driving a  Auto Union Grand Prix car. Stuck stormed through the  gravel course in 2 min 56 sec. In recent decades, the course was widened in order to be suitable for intense traffic and therefore is considered inappropriate for auto racing.

The modern Romanian hillclimbing event is the Viteză în Coastă or Campionatul Național de Viteză pe Traseu Montan (VTM).

Portugal
There are several traditional hillclimbing race events in Portugal, and its national championship growing in popularity since 2010. Falperra International Hill Climb is the most popular and famous hillclimb, being held since 1927, most of the editions as part of the European Championship.

Slovakia
There are several traditional hillclimbing race events in Slovakia. Some of the best known and most popular include the Pezinská Baba hillclimb race and the Dobšinský Kopec hillclimb race.

One of the most well known Slovak drivers competing in local and international hillclimb events is Jozef Béreš. Béreš is also very popular on social media networks thanks to the videos of him driving his legendary Audi Quattro S1 racecar.

Switzerland
Motor racing was banned in Switzerland in the aftermath of the fatal collision between cars at the 24 Hours of Le Mans race in 1955. However, this prohibition does not extend to events where drivers compete only indirectly via the clock. Events such as rallies, hillclimbs and slaloms are very popular, including the FIA European Hill Climb Championship.

The most known hillclimb races are the Gurnigelrennen, the course en côte Ayent - Anzère, the course en côte St. Ursanne - Les Rangiers, and the historic Klausen Hill Climb known as the Klausenpassrennen. Ludovico Scarfiotti clinched the European hillclimb championship at Ollon-Villars on August 30, 1965, driving a Dino Ferrari 2-litre.

See also
 European Hill Climb Championship

North America

Canada
Canada's best known hillclimb event is the Knox Mountain Hillclimb, held in Kelowna, British Columbia. It is a  paved road, climbing . It has run annually since the 1950s, attracting drivers from the Pacific Northwest.

United States

The Pikes Peak International Hill Climb is the world's premier hillclimb race. Winners include Indy 500 driver Bobby Unser and world rally champions Walter Röhrl, Stig Blomqvist, Ari Vatanen and Sébastien Loeb.

Mexico

Hillclimb races were held in México in the 1960s and 1970s in places like El Chico, Puebla and Lagunas de Zempoala.

On July 27, 1969, a very talented Mexican driver, Moisés Solana, died in the "Hill Climb Valle de Bravo-Bosencheve".

Since that time, hillclimbs had not been held in Mexico.until in September 30. 2017, Pedro Vargas, organized the first ever Hill Climb on tarmac in the Mexican state of Baja California. 
The temporary course was set on the road to the National Astronomical Observatory situated on the San Pedro Mártir mountain range, on a stretch from KM marker 50, to KM marker 80, making it the allegedly "The longest Hill Climb in the World".
It has been held the following years of 2018 and 2019, and, is scheduled to be run for the 4th. time on October 2 and 3 of 2020. 
The overall ascent record was set by the late Carlin Dunne at 14'-58" piloting a Honda CRF 450 c.c. supermoto.

Oceania

Australia

An Australian Hillclimb Championship was first staged in 1938 and has been contested annually since 1947.

Hillclimbing in Australia dates back to the early 1900s, and was most prevalent in the city of Melbourne, at locations such as Templestowe, Heidelberg and Rob Roy.

The course at Templestowe still exists today in the Domain Wetlands. The course was never trafficable due to the massive incline known as "the wall", with an incline ratio of 1:2.5 is thought to be the steepest bitumen surface in Australia, and so was only used during race events.
Burgundy Street in Heidelberg was used for early Hillclimbs.

The course at Rob Roy hosts race meets regularly, including rounds of the Victorian Hillclimb Championships. It is located just off Clintons Road, Christmas Hills in an area of Smiths Gully known as Rob Roy.

Mount Tarrengower, near Maldon in Central Victoria, has an annual Hillclimb hosted by the Victorian Vintage Sports Car Club, Bendigo Light Car Club and the Historic Motorcycle Racing Association of Victoria. The event is held on the 3rd weekend of October. It is now a "classics" only event, after a serious accident in the 1970s. Vintage motorcycles are now a feature of this event. Current champion is 2 time winner and only female competitor to take the title in the history of the climb, Stacey Heaney on a 1971 Yamaha XS650.

The MG Car Club of Queensland Inc. (est. 1954) built the Mount Cotton Hillclimb circuit and continues with its current management and operation.  The first event held at this facility was on Sunday 18 February 1968. The dedicated 946 metres of tarmac circuit hosts the annual Queensland Hillclimb Championships, the Club's annual six round Hillclimb series and inter-club competitions. The Australian Hillclimb Championships have been held there on at least 9 occasions.

The inaugural event, conducted in February 2014, covered ; the second running, in 2015, saw the course extended.

New Zealand
Hillclimbing is a popular club event in New Zealand, although a number of international competitors and foreign motor racing enthusiasts attend the premiere hillclimb event on the New Zealand motor racing calendar.

Race to the Sky was based near Queenstown.

The driver with the greatest number of "Race to the Sky" outright wins (8) is Nobuhiro "Monster" Tajima, driving his custom built Suzuki Escudo hillclimb special vehicle.

Africa

South Africa 

The best-known hillclimb event in South Africa is held annually in early May during the Knysna Speed Festival, currently known as The Simola Hillclimb and founded in 2009. It is a three-day event, with Classic Car Friday reserved for cars built prior to 1990 and restricted to 65 entries. The King of the Hill Challenge (limited to 84 entries), for standard production and unrestricted cars in various classes, takes place over the weekend. The Saturday is for practice and pre-qualifying, while Sunday features final qualifying, the class finals and then the category shoot outs. The course length is  up Simola Hill. It is very fast with the 2018 winning average speed being . There was no event in 2013 and 2020. 2020 was cancelled due to COVID-19. The eleventh running of the event was held on 3-5 September 2021.

Kenya 

The Kiamburing TT is an annual hillclimb event in Kenya. It is the first of its kind in East Africa and inspired by other international hillclimb events. It is a time attack event run on a closed course.

The event held in Kiambu County in October 20, 2013 brought together over 15 high performance cars to compete in a timed race on the  Kiambu-Ndumberi road.

Some of the drivers who have competed in the Kiamburing TT include Amir Mohammed (winner 2013 Kiamburing TT Endurance event) and Kay Wachira (winner 2014 Kiamburing TT Slalom Challenge).

See also
 Touge

References

External links

 Australia's oldest purpose-built Hillclimb track
 Hillclimb and Sprint Association. (Britain)
 TIME: Vroom at the Top (Friday, August 06, 1965)
 Photos and news from Italian hillclimbs (Italy)
 Photos of hill climbing in Malta.
 Ollon Villars revival. (Switzerland)
 "Fearless Riders Turn Motor Bikes Into Goats" Popular Science, August 1932, early motorcycle hillclimbing

 
Auto racing by type
Motorcycle racing by type
Sports originating in France